The Pisgah Rural Historic District, in Fayette and Woodford counties near Versailles, Kentucky, is a  historic district which was listed on the National Register of Historic Places in 1989.

It is an area northeast of Versailles roughly bounded by S. Elkhorn Creek, U.S. Route 60, and Big Sink Rd.

It includes Mid 19th Century Revival, Early Republic, Late Victorian architecture.

The listing included 151 contributing buildings, 49 contributing structures, and 57 contributing sites.

References

Historic districts on the National Register of Historic Places in Kentucky
National Register of Historic Places in Fayette County, Kentucky
National Register of Historic Places in Woodford County, Kentucky
Georgian architecture in Kentucky
Victorian architecture in Kentucky
Farms on the National Register of Historic Places in Kentucky